Frances L. "Chance" Irvine (born November 25, 1940) was an American politician in the state of Florida.

Irvine was born in Virginia and came to Florida in 1977. She served in the Florida House of Representatives for the 21st district from 1984 to 1992, as a Republican.

References

1940 births
Living people
Politicians from Charlottesville, Virginia
Women state legislators in Florida
Republican Party members of the Florida House of Representatives
21st-century American women